A sardine is a small, oily fish related to the herring, family Clupeidae

Sardine or sardines may also refer to other fish:

 Sardinops
 Lake Tanganyika sardine
 Black Sea sprat
 European sprat, aka Brisling sardine

Other fish-related topics:
 Sardine run
 Sardines (food)
 Canned sardine

Sardine or sardines may also refer to: 

 Sardines (game), a children's game
 Sardines (Inside No. 9), a pilot of Inside No. 9
 Sardine, Queensland, a locality in Barcaldine Region, Queensland, Australia
 Sardines (political movement), a political movement in Italy since 2019

See also
 Pilchard (disambiguation)
 Sardina (disambiguation)
 Sardinia (disambiguation)